Hen 2-437 is a planetary nebula in the constellation Vulpecula. It was first discovered by Rudolph Minkowski in 1946.

See also 
 List of largest nebulae
 Lists of nebulae

References 

 

Planetary nebulae
Vulpecula
Astronomical objects discovered in 1946